Phoenix Baia Mare was a football club based in Baia Mare, Romania. It was founded in 1932 and dissolved in 2000.

The club of the Chemical Factory from Baia Mare, was founded in 1932 and the first leaders were: Petru Wider (Chairman), Şt. Vadász (Sports Director) and Al. Cireşa (General Secretary).

History

In 1932–1933 the club started in the district championship. In August 1933 the Phoenix Stadium was inaugurated and in the summer of 1934 the team reached the quarter-finals of the Romanian Cup, being eliminated by AMEFA Arad 0–1. It participates at the first edition of the Divizia B (1934–1935) and finishes 1st in the 3rd series with the following team: Ferencz (Szabó) – Ardos, Holzmann – Man, Sava, Kert – Bojtas, I. Prassler, Freiberg, Pfeiffer, Iovicin (Szeremi II). It lost the play-off match, so missed out on the chance to play in the First Division. The situation repeats the following season, but the third time, at the end of the 1936–37 season it finishes once again on the first place and this time they were promoted. The team was: Ferencz, Szabó – Ardos, Holzmann, Man, Sava, Kert, Farkas, E. Prassler, Szeremi III, Freiberg, Szeremi II, Szeremi IV, Şt. Baskov, Iacobovits.

In 1937–38, playing in the first series of the First Division, Phoenix finishes 5th. The coach was: Rudolf Jenny, the squad being completed with Telegdy and Sikola.

The next season, 1938–39, the club appears with the name of Carpaţi Baia Mare (Al. Pop Chairman), finishing 7th, the same as in the 1939–40 season.

In the 1941–1944 period, the team played in the Hungarian Second Division.

After World War II, it changes its name back to Phoenix and in 1946 plays a play-off for a place in the Second Division against Minaur Baia Mare. The coach at the time was Edmund Nagy and the team used: Czaczar – Lezniczki, Ardos – Magyeri, Molnár (Formanek) – Moskovits, Gallis IV, Fr. Závoda I, Dallos (Bodocs), Balogh. It won the play-off and plays the following season in the Second Division.

In the summer of 1948 it participated unsuccessfully in a play-off tournament in Bucharest,  for a place in the next season of the First Division. Immediately after this failure, it merged with Minaur Baia Mare, the resulting club being FC Baia Mare, as it is named today.

But the factory kept a team named Cuprom (in 1964–65 Topitorul  and until 1974 Chimistul) which played in the Third Division. In 1993 the club was promoted to the Second Division, and changed its name to the traditional Phoenix, and plays at this level until 1995 when it was relegated. It then played in the Third Division until 2000 when it was dissolved.

Honours

Liga I
Winners (0):, Best finnish: 5th 1937–38

Liga II
Winners (4): 1934–35, 1935–36, 1936–37, 1947–48

Liga III
Winners (1): 1991–92, 1992–93

Liga IV – Maramureș County
Winners (1): 1986–87

References

Association football clubs established in 1932
Association football clubs disestablished in 2000
Defunct football clubs in Romania
Football clubs in Maramureș County
Liga I clubs
Liga II clubs
Baia Mare
1932 establishments in Romania
2000 disestablishments in Romania
Works association football clubs in Romania